Rasura (Lombard: Resüra) is a comune (municipality) in the Province of Sondrio in the Italian region Lombardy, located about  northeast of Milan and about  southwest of Sondrio.

Rasura borders the following municipalities: Bema, Cosio Valtellino, Pedesina, Rogolo.

Demographic evolution

References

Cities and towns in Lombardy